The Keefer Covered Bridge No. 7 is a historic wooden covered bridge located at Liberty Township near Washingtonville in Montour County, Pennsylvania. It is a 78 foot long, Burr Truss bridge built in 1853. It has a square opening; rare for covered bridges in Pennsylvania. It crosses Chillisquaque Creek.

It was listed on the National Register of Historic Places in 1979.

References 

Bridges in Montour County, Pennsylvania
Covered bridges on the National Register of Historic Places in Pennsylvania
Covered bridges in Montour County, Pennsylvania
Bridges completed in 1853
Wooden bridges in Pennsylvania
Tourist attractions in Montour County, Pennsylvania
National Register of Historic Places in Montour County, Pennsylvania
Road bridges on the National Register of Historic Places in Pennsylvania
Burr Truss bridges in the United States